Matthew "Matt" Murphy (born July 27, 1989) is a former American football guard.

Career

After playing college football for UNLV, he was signed by the Atlanta Falcons as an undrafted free agent on July 27, 2011. On September 28, 2011, he was signed to the Indianapolis Colts' practice squad, then claimed by waiver by the Cincinnati Bengals in May 2012. On August 24, 2012, Murphy was waived by the Bengals.

References

External links
Cincinnati Bengals bio

1989 births
Players of American football from California
Sportspeople from Lake Forest, California
Living people
American football offensive tackles
American football offensive guards
Georgia Bulldogs football players
Atlanta Falcons players
Indianapolis Colts players
Cincinnati Bengals players